Fish Bay is a bay and neighborhood on the island of Saint John in the United States Virgin Islands. Most of this area is part of Virgin Islands National Park.

References

Landforms of Saint John, U.S. Virgin Islands
Populated places in Saint John, U.S. Virgin Islands
Bays of the United States Virgin Islands